La Feria High School (LFHS) is a public high school located in La Feria, Texas, United States. It is the sole high school in the La Feria Independent School District. In 2015, the school was rated "Met Standard" by the Texas Education Agency.

LFHS was said to have been racially integrated first in 1957, making the class of 1959 the first integrated class in the state of Texas to graduate.

Athletics
The La Feria Lions compete in the following sports:

Baseball
Basketball
Cross country
Football
Golf
Powerlifting
Soccer
Softball
Tennis
Track and field
Volleyball

References

External links 
 

High schools in Cameron County, Texas
Public high schools in Texas